Lake Limestone is a  reservoir near Thornton, Texas .

The shoreline is irregular, and fish habitat is provided by brush, timber and aquatic plants.

The controlling authority for the reservoir and the Sterling C. Robertson Dam is the Brazos River Authority.

Lake Limestone has extensive recreational facilities including fishing, motor boating, jet skiing, and swimming.

Notes

General source
Water data for Texas: Lake Limestone

External links
Fishing Lake Limestone (Texas Parks and Wildlife)
Lake Limestone Campground and Marina

Limestone
Bodies of water of Leon County, Texas
Bodies of water of Limestone County, Texas
Bodies of water of Robertson County, Texas
Tourist attractions in Leon County, Texas
Tourist attractions in Limestone County, Texas
Tourist attractions in Robertson County, Texas
Dams in Texas
Brazos River Authority